The List of Zoos and Aquariums in Ireland includes zoos and aquaria in Ireland, including those who are members of the British and Irish Association of Zoos and Aquariums.

List

Major facilities
 Dublin Zoo (Dublin) 
 Fota Wildlife Park (Cork)

Specialist facilities
 Ardmore Open Farm and Mini Zoo (Waterford) 
 Clonfert Pet Farm (Kildare)
 Emerald Park (Ashbourne, County Meath)
 Moher Hill Open Farm and Leisure Park 
 National Reptile Zoo (Kilkenny)
 Secret Valley Wildlife Park (Wexford)
 Tropical World (Letterkenny)
Wild Ireland (County Donegal)
Wild Encounters Mini Zoo (Coolyroe, County Limerick)

Aquaria 
 Bray (Sea Life) Aquarium
 Dingle Oceanworld Aquarium (Dingle)
 Galway Atlantaquaria (Galway)

Sources 

Zoos in Ireland
Ireland